Iran Khodro currently lists the following automobiles and trucks.

Iran Khodro 
Tara
Dena 
Dena +
Runna +
Arisun 2
Soren +

Peugeot Co-Products
207i
206
Pars

References

External links
 Iran Khodro Industrial Group

Iran Khodro vehicles
IranKhodro